Ve (В в; italics: В в) is a letter of the Cyrillic script. It commonly represents the voiced labiodental fricative , like  in "vase". It can also represent 

The capital letter Ve looks the same as the capital Latin letter B but is pronounced differently.

Ve is commonly romanized by the Latin letter V but sometimes the Latin letter W (such as in Polish or German).

History
Both Ve and the Cyrillic letter Be (Б б) were derived from the Greek letter Beta (Β β), which already represented  in Greek by the time the Cyrillic alphabet was created.

In the Cyrillic numeral system, it had the value of 2.

Usage
In Russian and Bulgarian, Ve generally represents , but at the end of a word or before voiceless consonants, it represents the voiceless . Before a palatalizing vowel, it represents .

In standard Ukrainian pronunciation (based on the Poltava dialect), Ve represents a sound like the English W when in the word final position.

Additionally, some Ukrainians also use this pronunciation in words where the letter is directly preceded by a consonant, while for others all occurrences of the letter Ve denote . In Eastern Ukraine, the letter Ve may represent a voiceless , but this is considered a Russianism, as word-final devoicing does not occur in standard Ukrainian. However in Eastern Ukraine one is likely to hear the Russified  (with final devoicing).

In Belarusian, the letter Ve represents only the sound . In the word final position, or if directly proceeded by a consonant, it mutates to the letter Short U (Ў ў), a Belarusian letter representing the sound .

In Rusyn, the letter Ve represents the sound /v/, or /w/ if it is at the end of the word.

In Serbian and Montenegrin, the letter Ve represents only the sound /v/.

In Macedonian the letter is used for the sound /v/, but if the letter appears at the end of the word then it is pronounced as /f/. An example of this is the word бев [bɛf] ('I was').

In Tuvan, it is used for /ʋ/.

In Mongolian, Kalmyk, and Dungan, it is used for /w/.

Related letters and other similar characters
Β β : Greek letter Beta
Б б : Cyrillic letter Be
Ѵ ѵ : Cyrillic Letter Izhitsa
B b : Latin letter B
V v : Latin letter V
W w : Latin letter W
Ԝ ԝ : Cyrillic Letter We

Computing codes

External links

References